Normolipoproteinemic xanthomatosis is a cutaneous condition characterized by a xanthoma in the presence of normal cholesterol and lipoprotein levels.

See also 
 Cerebrotendinous xanthomatosis
 Verruciform xanthoma
 Skin lesion

References 

Skin conditions resulting from errors in metabolism